The Cornell Big Red represented Cornell University in ECAC women's ice hockey during the 2016–17 NCAA Division I women's ice hockey season.

Offseason

Hannah Bunton, Micah Hart Jaime Bourbonnais and Kristin O'Neill were selected for the Canadian National Development Team.

Recruiting

2016–17 Big Red

Schedule

|-
!colspan=12 style=""| Regular Season

|-
!colspan=12 style=""| ECAC Tournament

|-
!colspan=12 style=""| NCAA Tournament

Awards and honors

Doug Derraugh, ECAC Coach of the Year
Paula Voorheis, Mandi Schwartz Student-Athlete of the Year
Micah Hart, Defense, All-ECAC First Team
Hannah Bunton, Forward, All-ECAC Third Team
Jaime Bourbonnais, Defense, All-ECAC Rookie Team, USCHO Rookie team
Kristin O'Neill, Forward, All-ECAC Rookie Team

References

Cornell
Cornell Big Red women's ice hockey seasons
Cornell
Cornell